The Vicar of Nibbleswicke is a children's story written by Roald Dahl and illustrated by Quentin Blake. It was first published in 1991, after Dahl's death the previous year, by Century. The protagonist is a dyslexic vicar, and the book was written to benefit the Dyslexia Institute in London (now Dyslexia Action), with Dahl and Blake donating their rights.

Summary

The Reverend Robert Lee, the new vicar of Nibbleswicke, is suffering from a rare and acutely embarrassing condition: Back-to-Front Dyslexia, a fictional type of dyslexia that causes the subject to say the most important word (often being the verb) in a sentence backwards, creating comedic situations.  For example, instead of saying knits, he will say stink; God would be dog etc. It affects only his speech, and he doesn't realize he's doing it, but the parishioners of Nibbleswicke are shocked and confused by his seemingly inappropriate comments, especially the church's most generous benefactor, Miss Arabella Prewt, who does not take kindly to being called 'Miss Twerp'. However, thanks to the local doctor, a cure is found (walking backwards everywhere for the rest of his life), and the mild-mannered vicar can resume normal service.

The book contains a reference to Dahl's previous novel Esio Trot, noting that its title is tortoise backwards.

Editions
  (paperback, 2004)
  (paperback, 1994)

References

1991 British novels
Children's books by Roald Dahl
Jonathan Cape books
Books published posthumously
1991 children's books